Prellenkirchen is a town in the district of Bruck an der Leitha in Lower Austria in Austria.

Geography
Prellenkirchen lies in the industrial area of Lower Austria. About 5.55 percent of the municipality is forested.

References

Cities and towns in Bruck an der Leitha District